The angled worm lizard (Agamodon anguliceps) is a species of reptile in the family Trogonophidae. It is found in Somalia in the Horn of Africa. Markings on specimens of Agamodon anguliceps are mottled as yellowish white with darker brown markings along the side of the lizard. The anatomical skull structure of the angled worm lizard features a short, sharp angle between the occipitoparietal and facial plane region.

References

Agamodon
Endemic fauna of Somalia
Reptiles of Somalia
Reptiles described in 1882
Taxa named by Wilhelm Peters